Prolecanitida is an order of extinct ammonoid cephalopods with discoidal to thinly lenticular shells with goniatitic or ceratitic sutures and which retained the simple retrochoanitic siphuncle with backward extending septal necks. As typical for ammonoids the siphuncle is along the ventral margin. Prolecanitids form a relatively small and stable order within the Ammonoidea with 43 named genera and about 1250 species, but with a long-ranging lineage of about 108 m.y. stretching from the Lower Carboniferous to the Triassic. Although not as diverse as their goniatitid contemporaries, the Prolecanatida provided the stock from which all later Mesozoic ammonoids were derived.

Evolution and phylogeny
The origin of the Prolecanitida may be found in the Prolobitidae which was originally included in the Anarcestida but recently removed to the Goniatitida. Following their inception, the Prolecanitida divided into two lineages, identified by superfamilies; the earlier U Dev – M Perm Prolecanitoidea in which the shells are fairly smooth and characteristically have a large umbilicus and the later U Miss-Trias Medlicottioidea in which the umbilicus is small and there is moderate sculpture along the flanks. The Prolecanitoidea, through the derived family Daraelitidae is the source for the Ceratitida, beginning with the Xenodiscidae.

Prolecanitid genera averaged 14.7 m.y. in duration as compared to 5.7 m.y. for Upper Carboniferous goniatitids.

Suture morphology in the Prolecanitida changed dramatically over time, from very simple sutures in the earliest (Devonian) genera to extremely complex-sutured genera in the late Paleozoic. The increase in suture complexity over the 108 m.y. duration resulted from the iterative of addition of umbilical lobes, serration of lobes, and the subdivision of lateral and ventral lobes. As many as 12–15 replicate, U-shaped umbilical lobes, originating at the umbilicus and migrating across the flanks were added to the sutures during both ontogeny and phylogeny.

Not only did the Prolecanitida evolve their sutures differently than in the Goniatitda, by increasing the number of umbilical lobes rather than by subdivision of the lateral saddle, their body chambers were short by comparison. This brings up the question of just how closely related were the Prolecanitida and their Mesozoic descendants to the goniatitids.

References 

Miller, Furnish, and Schindewolf, 1957; Paleozoic Ammonoidea, Suborder Prolecanitina, L69, in The Treatise on Invertebrate Paleontology, Part L, Ammonoidea.
 Saunders and Work; Abstract Evolution of shell morphology and suture complexity in Paleozoic prolecanitids..... 
 Species and Genus Level Evolution in the Fossil Record 

 
Cephalopod orders
Late Devonian first appearances
Late Devonian animals
Triassic extinctions